The Artificial Intelligence Center is a laboratory in the Information and Computing Sciences Division of SRI International. It was founded in 1966 by Charles Rosen and studies artificial intelligence. One of their early projects was Shakey the Robot, the first general-purpose mobile robot. More recently, the center funded early development of CALO and Siri. The center has also provided the military with various technology.

See also
 Augmentation Research Center

References

External links
 

SRI International
Artificial intelligence laboratories